Aaron Allard-Morgan (born 20 November 1980) was the winner of Big Brother 2011. He was a contract manager from Weston-super-Mare. He was nominated for eviction in Weeks 1, 3, 5 and 7. On each occasion, he received the highest proportion of votes to save from the public.  On Day 41, Aaron was one of four housemates to win a place at a red carpet premiere of horror movie Paranormal Activity 3.  Aaron is the twelfth winner of Big Brother UK winning £50,990.

Aaron has made several television appearances since leaving the house on OK! TV, The Wright Stuff and Big Brother's Bit on the Side. He is currently running a bar in Weston-super-Mare and wrote a book about his experience in Big Brother.

References

Reality show winners
1980 births
Big Brother (British TV series) winners
People from Blackpool
Living people